Club Athlétique Périgueux Dordogne (also known as just CA Périgourdin) is a French rugby union club that currently competes in the second division of French club rugby, the Pro D2 competition. Périgueux played in the higher divisions in the early 2000s but were relegated from Rugby Pro D2 after the 2004-05 season. The club was formed in 1901 and play in white and blue colours.

Honors
 France Deuxième série:
 Champions: 1906
 France Juniors B:
 Champions: 1960
 Coupe Frantz Reichel:
 Champions: 1966
 France Réserve:
 Champions: 1969
 France Groupe B:
 Champions: 1993
 France Groupe A2:
 Runners-up: 1998

Current players
  Samuela Lisala
  Tedo Zibzibadze
  Irakli Gundishvili

Notable former players

 Guy Belletante 
 Lilian Camberabero
 Daniel Héricé
 Henri Lacaze 
 Jean Larribau
 Christian Magnanou
 Gérard Mauduy
 Gilbert Meyer
 Georges Peyroutou
 Jean Pilon
 Eric Moureux
 Ben Botica
 Thierry Teixeira

See also
 List of rugby union clubs in France

References

External links
L'école
Féminin

Perigueux
Sport in Dordogne